Gil Moore is a Canadian musician. Born in Toronto, Moore was the drummer and co-vocalist (sharing vocal duties with guitarist/vocalist Rik Emmett) of the Canadian power trio Triumph. Before Moore was in Triumph he was in a band called Sherman & Peabody which also featured Buzz Shearman of Moxy and Greg Godovitz of Goddo.

He co-wrote and contributed lead vocals to a number of Triumph songs and also performed this function live. While Emmett's vocals and songwriting tended toward the more melodic side of Triumph, Moore's vocal and writing style was more blues/hard rock oriented, although on the original line-up's last two albums, Moore also began writing and singing lead on a number of softer, ballad-style songs.

Moore is the owner of Canada's biggest recording studio Metalworks Studios, located in Mississauga, Ontario. The studio has been around for over 30 years and has recorded acts such as Drake, Guns N' Roses, Aerosmith, Katy Perry, Black Eyed Peas, Jonas Brothers and many more. Moore works as the CEO of Metalworks Studios, Metalworks Production Group and Metalworks Institute.

Awards and accolades

References 

Living people
Canadian rock drummers
Canadian rock singers
Canadian male singers
Canadian songwriters
Canadian heavy metal drummers
Canadian male drummers
Musicians from Toronto
Triumph (band)
Writers from Toronto
20th-century Canadian drummers
Year of birth missing (living people)